The Nukak language is a language of uncertain classification, perhaps part of the macrofamily Puinave-Maku. It is very closely related to Kakwa.

Phonology

Vowels
There are six oral and six nasal vowels.

The vowel  becomes the labial semivowel  in several environments: in postnuclear position (when it appears immediately after the nuclear vowel of a morpheme), before another vowel, and at the beginning of the word or syllable.

The vowel  becomes the palatal semivowel  in postnuclear position.

Nasalization in Nukak language is a prosodic property of the morpheme that affects all segments within each morpheme except voiceless stops. Each morpheme is either completely nasal or completely oral.

Consonants

The following table of consonant phonemes shows each phoneme followed by the corresponding letter in the Nukak alphabet, where different.

The voiced palatal allophones  ~  can be considered variants of the vowel  when they precede a vowel in the initial position of a root or of an affix, or when they lie between two vowels.

Tones

The nuclear vowels of nouns, verbs, and adjectives bear tone. Nukak has two tonemes (minimal pairs exist between them): high (H) and rising (LH). In the surface phonology there are also a low tone and a falling tone. Unaccented syllables always bear the low tone (toneless).

The high and rising tones occur only in monosyllabic, monomorphemic lexemes. Multisyllabic morphemes are stressed on the first syllable.

Grammar

Typology

The default word order in sentences is subject–object–verb (SOV). In any case, the subject always precedes the object. Verbs are conjugated for person. The language is agglutinative. The grammatical and lexical meanings expressed by prepositions in the Indo-European languages are expressed by suffixes in Nukak. Adjectives, which are not inflected for grammatical gender, usually follow their head noun.

Noun
The Nukak nouns are marked for gender, number, and case. There are two grammatical genders. The plural of animate nouns is indicated with the suffix -wɨn. Case markers include the following:
accusative -na
dative -ré'  ("to")
instrumental -hî'  ("with")
locative -rí'   ("in", "by")
genitive -î '  ("of", "belongs to")

Depending on the noun lexeme, the vocative case is expressed by a tone change; by the suffix -a;  or by duplicating the nuclear vowel after the root final consonant.

Nouns can take tense suffixes, e.g., -hîpî' , "that [masculine] which came before", and a question suffix, -má' .  The connective formative -tɨ expresses either coordination with another noun, i.e., "also", or the clause conjunction, "and".

Noun classifying suffixes are common: -na'   (long and slender), -da'   "small and round", -dub "small, slender, and pointed", -nɨi "flat and thin", -ne "long-haired", -yi "abundant, profuse".

Pronouns

Possessive pronouns are free forms: wî'  "mine", mí'  "yours singular",  aî'  "his", mi'î'  "hers", wîi'  "our", ñí'  "yours plural, i'î'  "theirs". The relations "my, your, her", etc. are expressed with prefixes on the possessed noun: wa "my", ma "your singular", a, "his", mi "her", hi "our", ñi "your plural", i "their". In conjugation, the same prefixes are agent (subject) markers. They occur either with or without personal pronouns.

Interrogative words
déi ("what?" "which" referring to things), de pán "what?" referring to actions, háu'ka, de'e "who?", déimɨnɨ "when?", ded "where?", jáu'  why?". They combine with various other markers, e.g., case suffixes: the allative de' yúkú "towards where?", the  instrumental de'e hin "with whom?", the genitive de'e î'  "whose?". Interrogatives combine with tense markers as in jáu' ra'  ("due to what?" + recent past).

Verbs
Verbs are conjugated with a subject prefix and with suffixes and infixes expressing aspect (continuous, immediate); tense (past, present, future) and mood (imperative, desiderative, interrogative). For example:
Past -nábé
Future -nátu' 
dubitative -náhitu' 
Conditional -'náno'
Present
imperfect  -náka
negative -kaná
continuing -né' 
Interrogative
past -yáa
future -pî' 
conditional -no'pî' 
present -ráa' 
negative -ka
Desiderative -iná- ("perhaps")
Planeative -ɨí' - ("to plan" an action)
Repetitive -pî- ("repeatedly")
Agentive -rít ("because", "due to")

The imperative mood is formed by duplicating the last vowel of the verb stem, after the root final consonant or semivowel. The vowels [u] and [i] are pronounced as semivowels [w], [j] when duplicated after the final consonant.

The past imperfect is formed by suffixing to the stem the duplicate of the last vowel in the stem plus [p]:  (-VC-Vp). The combination of the past imperfect suffix with the marker -tí´  marks a past subjunctive: jɨm "to be"; jɨmɨ "may have been",; past imperfect jɨmɨp "was"; subjunctive preterite jɨmɨptí´  "if it were".

Verbal negation is expressed in different ways: with the suffix -ka, which comes between the verb root and the tense, mood, and aspect markers; with certain prefixes to the verb stem; with the words yab´ , "no", dɨi´ , "refuse", îí´ , "without effect" . Negative commands have a specific marker, -kê´ .

There are many compound verbs. The elements may be two or more verb roots or they may be a verb root plus a noun, adjective, or adverb. The marker -a converts an intransitive verb root into a transitive verb.

Verbs are nominalized with the suffixes -hát, the abstract idea of the action, -pe' , the affected object, participle. The agent of the action is indicated with the agentive ("actance") prefix and a suffix expressing person and number. The agentive suffixes are -ni'  for the first person, second person, and third person singular feminine; -ni for the third person singular masculine; and -nit for the third person plural. To these may be added the marker for imminence, currently in progress, or emphasis, -yé' .

All verb roots end in a consonant or semivowel. The meaning "to be" can be expressed in two ways: explicitly with the verb jɨm or tacitly through the various interrogative markers along with the personal pronouns, and occasionally with another verb, yit, which has the emphatic form yittí' , "I am".

Adverbs
The Nukak language has many adverb forms. Various adverbs are important in the construction of sentences. For example, they frequently use hébáká "indeed", and for even greater insistence, -yé'  is suffixed. The verbal link tɨtíma'hî "after" can occur between the subject and the object and verb. Morphologically, some adverbs are independent words; these can follow nouns, like hattí'  "also", "neither", "yet". There are some adverbial suffixes, e.g., -hê'  "only", "precisely".

Interjections
Kútu'  "Hey!", "Attention!" is an exclamation said in order to begin to speak. Other exclamatory words or phrases are hâré "Be careful!" or dɨpí hâré "Be very careful!"; waá'yé'  "Enough!; be'bét yé'  "Hurry up!"; ni'kábá'í'  "That's it!".

References

Sources

Asociación Nuevas Tribus de Colombia 1982 a 1993 ("New Tribes of Colombia Association 1982 to 1993"): Informes trimestrales de actividades, presentados a la Dirección General de Asuntos Indígenas del Ministerio de Gobierno o del Interior, Bogotá: varios mecs. ("Trimestral Activities Report, Presented to the Board of General Indigenous Affairs of the Government or the Interior, Bogotá: various mecs.")
Cabrera, Gabriel; Carlos Franky y Dany Mahecha 1999: Los N+kak: nómadas de la Amazonia colombiana; Bogotá: Universidad Nacional de Colombia. 
Cathcart, Marylin 1979: "Fonología del Cacua", Sistémas Fonológicos Colombianos IV: 9-45. ILV; Lomalinda (Meta): Editorial Townsend.
Hess, Richard; Kenneth Conduff and Jan Ellen Conduff 2005: Gramatica Pedagógica Provisional del idioma Nɨkák. Bogotá: Iglesia Nuevos Horizontes.
Mahecha, Dany 2006 "Los nɨkak: experiencias y aprendizajes del contacto con otras gente". W. Leo Wetzels (ed.) Language Endangerment and Endangered Languages: Linguistic and Anthropological Studies with Special Emphasis on the Languages and Cultures of the Andean-Amazonian Border Area. ILLA – CNWS. Leiden University.
Mahecha Rubio, Dany; Gabriel Cabrera y Carlos Franky 2000: "Algunos aspectos fonético-fonológicos del idioma Nukak [n+kak]"; Lenguas indígenas de Colombia. Una visión descriptiva: 547-560. María Stella González de Pérez ed. Bogotá: Instituto Caro y Cuervo.- 
Silverwood-Cope, Peter L. 1990 Os makú, povo caçador do nordeste da Amazônia. Editora Universidade de Brasília. 

Languages of Colombia
Nadahup languages
Subject–object–verb languages
Tonal languages
Kakua–Nukak languages